Oscar Normann Sand (11 August 1921 – 14 August 1974) is a Norwegian politician for the Labour Party.

He served as a deputy representative to the Norwegian Parliament from Akershus during the term 1965–1969.

On the local level, Sand was mayor of Oppegård municipality from 1956 to 1960.

References

1921 births
1974 deaths
Deputy members of the Storting
Labour Party (Norway) politicians
Mayors of places in Akershus
People from Oppegård